The 2014–15 Ligakupa was the 8th and final edition of the Hungarian association football League Cup, the Ligakupa.

Group stage

Group A

Group B

Group C

Group D

Group E

Group F

Group G

Group H

Round of 16

|}

Quarter-finals

|}

Semi-finals

|}

Final

External links
 Tournament at soccerway.com
 worldfootball.net

2014–15 in Hungarian football
2014–15 European domestic association football cups
2014-15